Air control may refer to: 

Air Control (video game), a 2014 video game
Air traffic control, a service for directing aircraft traffic, mainly civilian
Air supremacy, the military concept of controlling an area through airpower
Airborne early warning and control, a system for directing military aircraft from the air
Forward air control, a system for directing military aircraft on the battlefield
Ground-controlled interception, a system for directing military aircraft from a central ground base